Savill is an English language surname. People with this name include:

Al Savill (1917–1989), US banker and hotel owner
Alfred Savill (1829–1905), founder of Savills, a UK company
Christian Savill (born 1970), English musician
Craig Savill (born 1978), Canadian curler
Harriet Elizabeth Savill  (1789–1857), English actress, wife of John Faucit
J. E. Savill (c. 1847–1920) racehorse owner and trainer in South Australia
John Faucit Saville or Savill, (1783?–1853), English actor and theatre manager, husband of Harriet
John Savill (born 1957), UK higher education administrator
Leonard Savill (1869–1959), Anglican clergyman
Les Savill (born 1935), English cricketer
Tom Savill (born 1983), English cricketer

Other uses
Savill Building in Surrey, England
Savill Garden  in Surrey, England

See also
 Savile
 Saville (disambiguation)
 Savills
 Seville